Michael Krämer (born 9 December 1985) is a German footballer. He made his debut on the professional league level in the 2. Bundesliga for SpVgg Greuther Fürth on 29 April 2005, when he came on as a substitute in the 54th minute in a game against Rot-Weiß Oberhausen.

References

1985 births
Living people
German footballers
SpVgg Greuther Fürth players
1. FC Nürnberg players
2. Bundesliga players
Association football defenders
Footballers from Nuremberg